Castanopsis foxworthyi is a tree in the family Fagaceae. It is named for the botanist Frederick William Foxworthy.

Description
The smooth bark is blackish brown.

Distribution and habitat
Castanopsis foxworthyi grows naturally in Peninsular Malaysia and Borneo. Its habitat is dipterocarp, peat swamp and kerangas forests from sea-level to  altitude.

References

foxworthyi
Trees of Peninsular Malaysia
Trees of Borneo
Plants described in 1913
Flora of the Borneo lowland rain forests